The Frog Creek Cabin, in Yosemite National Park, was listed on the National Register of Historic Places in 2014.

It is National Park Service Rustic in style.

It is located along the south shore of Lake Eleanor, along Frog Creek, in the relatively remote northeast section of Yosemite National Park.

The listing includes the cabin and also a non-contributing structure, the ruin of

References

National Register of Historic Places in Tuolumne County, California
Buildings and structures completed in 1936
National Park Service rustic in Yosemite National Park